Edward Howel Francis, BSc, DSc, FRSE, FGS (31 May 1924 – 22 May 2014)  was a British geologist and Emeritus Professor of Earth Sciences at the University of Leeds.  He was President of the Geological Society of London from 1980 to 1982.

Biography
Francis was born in south Wales and went to school in Port Talbot.  He was called up for military service after two years, commissioned in the Cheshire Regiment and served in the Mediterranean. After three years in the Army, he graduated from University College, Swansea (now Swansea University) in 1949.  He joined the Institute of Geological Sciences (now the British Geological Survey) where he rose through the ranks from field geologist in Scotland to Assistant Director for Northern England and Wales, based in Leeds.

In 1977 Francis was appointed Professor of Earth Sciences at the University of Leeds.  He retired from his chair with the title Emeritus Professor in 1989 and was awarded an Honorary Fellowship of University College, Swansea in the same year.

Honours

  Fellowship of the Royal Society of Edinburgh (1962)
  Awarded the Murchison Fund of the Geological Society of London (1963)
  DSc, University of Wales (1969)
  Clough Medal of the Edinburgh Geological Society (1983)
  Sorby Medal of the Yorkshire Geological Society (1983)
  Major John Sacheverell A’Deane Coke Medal of the Geological Society of London (1989)

Publications

 The Carboniferous period. Edward Howel Francis, B.SC., F.R.S.E., F.G.S. and Austin William Woodland, PH.D., F.G.S. Geological Society, London, Special Publications 1964, v. 1, p. 221-232.
 Caledonide volcanism in Britain and Ireland. C.J. Stillman and E.H. Francis. Geological Society, London, Special Publications 1979, v. 8, p. 555-577.
 Mid-Devonian to early Permian volcanism: Old World. E.H. Francis. Geological Society, London, Special Publications 1988, v. 38, p. 573-584.

References

1924 births
2014 deaths
People educated at Port Talbot County Boys' Grammar School
Alumni of Swansea University
Academics of the University of Leeds
British geologists
Fellows of the Royal Society of Edinburgh
Fellows of the Geological Society of London